CUMYL-PEGACLONE (SGT-151) is a gamma-carboline based synthetic cannabinoid that has been sold as a designer drug. The gamma-carboline core structure seen in CUMYL-PEGACLONE had not previously been encountered in a designer cannabinoid, though it is similar in structure to other gamma-carboline cannabinoids disclosed by Bristol-Myers Squibb in 2001.

Legal status 
Sweden's public health agency classified CUMYL-PEGACLONE as a narcotic substance, on January 18, 2019.

See also 
 5F-CUMYL-PEGACLONE
 CUMYL-CB-MEGACLONE
 CUMYL-CH-MEGACLONE
 CUMYL-BC-HPMEGACLONE-221
 CUMYL-PINACA
 CUMYL-5F-P7AICA
 UR-12

References 

Cannabinoids
Designer drugs
Gamma-Carbolines